The 1977 Washington Redskins season was the franchise's 46th season overall, and would be the last under Hall of Fame head coach George Allen. The season began with the team trying to improve on their 10–4 record from 1976, but they would finish 9-5 and fail to qualify for postseason play.

Offseason

NFL Draft

Roster

Regular season

Schedule

Game summaries

Week 2
TV Network: CBS
Announcers: Vin Scully, Sonny Jurgensen
In front of a sell out crowd, Billy Kilmer lobbed a two-yard scoring pass to Mike Thomas in the third period and Atlanta failed to capitalize on several opportunities for touchdowns as Washington beats Atlanta. Despite the touchdown pass, Kilmer drew the ire of Washington's fans by throwing two interceptions and fumbling in Atlanta's territory.

Week 4
The Tampa Bay Buccaneers try to win their first ever game as they their proud defense held the Redskins to just 10 points and only 118 passing yards allowed but still they lost to the Redskins. All of the Redskins 10 points we're scored in the first period. Kicker Mark Moseley kicked a 44-yard field goal and Mike Thomas 6-yard td run were the only scores of the game for both teams. The Redskins limited the Bucs offense to minus 1 yard in the first half and never look back. Redskins Bill Brundige said it best about the Bucs when he said "I leave Tampa admiring their defense. It's a winner but the offense... coach John McKay is going to have to learn that the I-formation isn't going to work. He isn't at USC anymore playing Stanford.

Week 7
TV Network: CBS
Announcers: Don Criqui and Sonny Jurgensen
Joe Theismann started at quarterback for Washington and early on he was on his game as he threw two early touchdown passes and Mark Moseley kicked three field goals, Theismann replaced 38-yard-old Billy Kilmer, hit tight end Jean Fugett with a pair of 15-yard touchdown passes on Washington's first two possessions while Moseley kicked field goals of 46 and 30 yards. Moseley added a third one from 51 yards in the third quarter. The Eagles ran out of time in a bid to win, getting as close to the Redskins' 20-yard line before turning the ball over on downs with 41 seconds to play. The Eagles though gave it a battle as Ron Jaworski tossed a 48-yard touchdown pass to Harold Carmichael, a 16-run touchdown by James Betterson and a 44-yard field goal made this a good game involving these two teams.

Week 9
TV Network: CBS
Announcers: Don Criqui and Sonny Jurgensen
In a rematch from two weeks ago, the Eagles opened up scoring with a 21-yard touchdown pass from Ron Jaworski to Tom Sullivan in the only score of the first half. The Redskins tied the score in the third period on a 6-play 65-yard drive and ended with a 14-yard touchdown pass from Joe Theismann to Frank Grant. The Eagles untied it in the fourth period as Jaworski scored from one yard. The Redskins then came back first Dallas Hickman blocked an Eagles punt and advanced it to the Philadelphia 19. A 10-yard unsportsmanlike conduct foul moved the Skins to the 9 where Theismann and Calvin Hill each ran for 2 yards then Theismann hit Danny Buggs for 5 yards to tie the game. Later the Redskins' Mark Moseley kicked a 54-yard field goal to put the Skins ahead by 3, but back came the Eagles where they drove from their own 14 to the Washington 14 where after 3 incomplete passes. Horst Muhlmann came on and with 18 seconds to play miss an easy 31-yard field goal to seal an Redskins win.

Week 13
TV Network: CBS
Announcers: Pat Summerall, Tom Brookshier
It was a key game for both teams. Washington drew first blood as the well rested Billy Kilmer tossed a 14-yard touchdown pass to Calvin Hill and later a 40-yard field goal by Mark Moseley. But back came the Cardinals, knowing that they need to win to stay in the playoff hunt, as they got a 32-yard field goal by Jim Bakken and later a 1-yard touchdown run by Steve Jones. Moseley then kicked a 23-yard field goal with 34 seconds left to give the Redskins a 13-10 halftime lead. Then Brad Dusek intercept a Hart pass in the second half at the Cardinals' 47 to set up Moseley's 42-yard field goal and the Redskins lead. Moseley also kicked a 37-yard field goal. The Redskins then added another touchdown as Mike Thomas scored from the 4 to give the Redskins a 26–13 lead. The Cardinals tried to muster their famed come from behind victories that was their trademark from 1974 to 1976, as quarterback Jim Hart hit Terry Metcalf for a 68-yard touchdown strike. Late in the game the Cardinals rallied to try to take the lead. Their first attempt ended on downs and then in their final fateful drive it ended with an interception by Eddie Brown to seal the Redskins win and with that loss The Cardinals we're out of the playoff picture.

Week 14

Standings

Awards, records, and honors

References

Washington
Washington Redskins seasons
Washing